Stanimir Georgiev (born 7 August 1975 in Plovdiv, Bulgaria) is a retired Bulgarian professional football forward who played for several clubs in Europe.

Club career
Georgiev played for PFC CSKA Sofia, PFC Slavia Sofia, PFC Rodopa Smolyan and PFC Spartak Varna in Bulgaria and FC Gomel in Belarus. He had a brief spell in the Turkish Super Lig with Kocaelispor.

References

External links
 

1975 births
Living people
Bulgarian footballers
Association football forwards
First Professional Football League (Bulgaria) players
Bulgarian expatriate footballers
Expatriate footballers in Turkey
Expatriate footballers in Belarus
Expatriate footballers in Malta
Expatriate footballers in Greece
PFC Spartak Varna players
PFC Lokomotiv Plovdiv players
PFC Dobrudzha Dobrich players
FC Chernomorets Burgas players
PFC CSKA Sofia players
PFC Cherno More Varna players
PFC Slavia Sofia players
Kocaelispor footballers
PFC Rodopa Smolyan players
FC Gomel players
Marsaxlokk F.C. players
Olympiacos Volos F.C. players